The 1965 Houston Cougars football team was an American football team that represented the University of Houston as an independent during the 1965 NCAA University Division football season. In its fourth season under head coach Bill Yeoman, the team compiled a 4–5–1 record. Cotton Guerrant was the team captain. The team played its home games at the Astrodome in Houston

Schedule

References

Houston
Houston Cougars football seasons
Houston Cougars football